Subodh Kumar (born 10 June 1990) is an Indian football player who last plays for CFL Premier A club BSS. Talented mid-field player with great speed and endurance. An introvert player who believes in attacking football. Expert in free kicks with outstanding ball control. Member of the Gold Medal winning team at SAF Cup – Dhaka. Also represented the country in AFC U-19 at Iran, U-23 SAF Games at Dhaka and the U-19 team exposure trip to Germany.2010 played again games in China Guangzhou  lost with Japan. Get awarded from Jharkhand ratna .

Club career

Indian Arrows
After spending years in the East Bengal F.C. youth system Kumar moved to new side Indian Arrows for the 2010-11 I-League season. He scored his only goal for Arrows during his only appearance for the club on 29 January 2011 against Viva Kerala FC in the I-League.

East Bengal
After spending one great season at Arrows, Kumar moved back to his former club East Bengal. He made his debut for East Bengal against Mumbai F.C. on 2 November 2011.

Before the 2015–16 season, it was announced that Kumar had been released by East Bengal.

Career statistics

Club
Statistics accurate as of 13 September 2013 2012

Honours 

India U23
 SAFF Championship: 2009

References

 

Indian footballers
1991 births
Living people
Footballers from West Bengal
I-League players
East Bengal Club players
Indian Arrows players
India youth international footballers
Association football defenders
Footballers at the 2010 Asian Games
Asian Games competitors for India